Tylencholaimellidae is a family of nematodes belonging to the order Dorylaimida.

Genera:
 Athernema Ahmad & Jairajpuri, 1978
 Aulolaimina
 Aulolaimoides Micoletzky, 1915
 Dorella Jairajpuri, 1964
 Doryllium Cobb, 1920
 Oostenbrinkella Jairajpuri, 1965
 Phellonema Thorne, 1964
 Tylencholaimellus Cobb, 1915

References

Nematode families